Shozo Miyamoto (born 1 March 1940) is a Japanese professional golfer.

Miyamoto played on the Japan Golf Tour, winning twice.

Professional wins (4)

Japan Golf Tour wins (2)

Japan Golf Tour playoff record (0–1)

Other wins (2)
1966 Kansai Open
1967 Japan PGA Championship

External links

Japanese male golfers
Japan Golf Tour golfers
Sportspeople from Osaka Prefecture
1940 births
Living people